Julieta Rosen ((); born 8 November 1962 in Mexico City, Mexico) is a Mexican actress. Her father is Mexican and her mother is Swedish.

Biography
She started her career at the age of 16 with the play Fulgor y Muerte de Joaquín Murrieta, at the University Theater "Carpa Geodésica", then started in her first professional role at the famous Teatro de la Ciudad with Don Juan Tenorio.

Her first telenovela was as "Julieta" in Un Solo Corazón with Daniel Martin. Many other telenovelas followed, like Encadenados with Christian Bach, Madres Egoístas with Orlando Carrio, and Infierno en el Paraíso with Juan Ferrara. She also played important roles in the historical television series Senda de Gloria and La Antorcha Encendida.

She was a series regular on the Columbia Tri-Star sitcom Viva Vegas starring Daniel Celario, Mario Celario, Ludo Vika, Mike Robelo, and Jossara Jinaro. In 2006 Rosen appeared in the telenovela Mi Vida Eres Tu, produced by Venevision. Since 2008, she co-stars as (Bree Van de Kamp) in the US Spanish language adaptation of Desperate Housewives.

In film, Rosen played the role of Esperanza de la Vega, wife of Diego de la Vega/Zorro in the 1998 movie The Mask of Zorro.

She is a former student of the Centro Universitario Anglo Mexicano.

Filmography

References

External links

Julieta Rosen at Esmas.com

1962 births
Living people
Mexican telenovela actresses
Mexican television actresses
Mexican film actresses
Mexican people of Swedish descent
Actresses from Mexico City
20th-century Mexican actresses
21st-century Mexican actresses
People from Mexico City